Clarence Joseph "Jay" Difani (December 21, 1922 – December 3, 2003) was an American professional baseball player.  He was a second baseman over parts of two seasons (1948–49) with the Washington Senators.  For his career, he compiled a .333 batting average with one hit in three at-bats.

An alumnus of the University of Missouri, he was born in and, later, died in Crystal City, Missouri at the age of 80.

External links

1922 births
2003 deaths
Washington Senators (1901–1960) players
Major League Baseball second basemen
Baseball players from Missouri
Little Rock Travelers players
Newark Bears (IL) players
Oakland Oaks (baseball) players
Birmingham Barons players
Augusta Tigers players
Beaumont Exporters players
Chattanooga Lookouts players
Charlotte Hornets (baseball) players
Amarillo Gold Sox players
Dallas Eagles players
People from Crystal City, Missouri
Missouri Tigers baseball players